Behlolpur  is a village in Kapurthala district of Punjab State, India. The village is administrated by a Sarpanch who is an elected representative.

Demography
According to the report published by Census India in 2011, Behlolpur has a total number of 111 houses and population of 603 of which include 312 males and 291 females. Literacy rate of Behlolpur is 57.66%, lower than state average of 75.84%.  The population of children under the age of 6 years is 81 which is 13.43% of total population of Behlolpur, and child sex ratio is approximately  723 lower than state average of 846.

Air travel connectivity 
The closest airport to the village is Sri Guru Ram Dass Jee International Airport.

Villages in Kapurthala

References

External links
  Villages in Kapurthala
 Kapurthala Villages List

Villages in Kapurthala district